= Paris Olympics =

Paris Olympics may refer to:

- 1900 Summer Olympics, Games of the II Olympiad
- 1924 Summer Olympics, Games of the VIII Olympiad
- 2024 Summer Olympics, Games of the XXXIII Olympiad

== See also ==
- 2024 Summer Paralympics, XVII Paralympic Games
